Scott Place Mounds is an archaeological site in Union Parish, Louisiana from the Late Coles Creek-Early Plaquemine period, dating to approximately 1200 CE. The site is one of the few such sites in north-central Louisiana.

Description
The site a five-mound complex located near the confluence of Corney Bayou and Lake D’Arbonne. All of the mounds were built in single stages. Charcoal samples taken from underneath Mound B have been dated to approximately 1200 CE.

See also
Culture, phase, and chronological table for the Mississippi Valley

References

External links
 Scott Place Mounds at waymarking.com

Archaeological sites of the Coles Creek culture
Plaquemine Mississippian culture
Mounds in Louisiana
Geography of Union Parish, Louisiana